Blow It to Bits is a 2019 French drama film directed by Lech Kowalski. It was screened in the Directors' Fortnight section at the 2019 Cannes Film Festival.

References

External links
 

2019 films
2019 drama films
French drama films
2010s French-language films
2010s French films